(German for "Western package",) is the common term for care packages sent by West Germans to their friends and families in East Germany during the division of Germany from 1961-1989.

History 
During the division of Germany from 1945-1990, and particularly after the construction of the Berlin Wall in 1961, East Germans were largely unable to visit West German friends and family members. At the urging of the Office for Pan-German Aid, many West Germans regularly sent packages to East German relatives, such as for birthdays or Christmas. In return, many East Germans would send an Ostpaket, often containing food, spirits, handicrafts, or confections, such as Stollen for Christmas. Beginning in the 1960s, East Germany was able to reliably provide basic necessities, but luxury and exotic products remained scarce.

 had to be labeled as "Gift shipment, not for sale" with a list of contents. Commonly requested items were clothing, bedding, confections, coffee, nylon stockings, and baking ingredients. Shipments were not permitted to contain money, such as West German Deutsche Marks; occasionally, currency was concealed inside of the packaging. Also banned was media that was could not be visually inspected, such as Compact Cassettes, which were confiscated by the authorities. Medicine, newspapers, toy guns and military-themed toys were also banned.

Packages often were prepared using high-quality materials, such as wrapping paper, which were frequently unavailable in the east, and were often saved and reused by the recipient.

To encourage families to maintain ties, the costs of the packages were tax-deductible. An average of 25 million packages were shipped per year, containing about 1,000 tonnes of coffee and five million articles of clothing. Both coffee and western clothing were highly desired and often used by the recipients to barter for other goods.

The government of East Germany initially tried to hamper the flow of packages, for example by demanding proof of disinfection for second-hand clothing, but eventually came to see the packages as an integral part of fulfilling domestic demand for consumer goods.  met about 20% of the East German coffee needs.

During the East German coffee crisis in 1977, the East German Politbüro and Socialist Unity Party incorporated West German coffee shipments into their plans to meet domestic demand despite reducing coffee imports due to unstable commodity prices.

See also  
 Economy of East Germany
 GARIOA

Further reading 
 Christian Härtel, Petra Kabus (ed.): Das Westpaket. Geschenksendung, keine Handelsware. Ch. Links, Berlin 2000, .
 Volker Ilgen: CARE-Paket & Co. Von der Liebesgabe zum Westpaket. Primus, Darmstadt 2008, .

References 

Cold War history of Germany
Economy of East Germany
Economy of West Germany
Humanitarian aid
Postal history of Germany
East Germany–West Germany relations